Night and Fog in Zona is a 2015 South Korean documentary film directed by Jung Sung-il. The cine-essay follows the renowned Chinese filmmaker Wang Bing as he works on two of his projects, 'Til Madness Do Us Part (2013) and Alone (2013). It made its world premiere at the 20th Busan International Film Festival in 2015.

Synopsis
Jung Sung-il has always envied the Paris audiences of Lumière brothers' documentary film La Sortie de l'Usine Lumière à Lyon of December 28, 1895, but not anymore. In the winter of 2003 when he watched his old friend Wang Bing's first film Tie Xi Qu: West of the Tracks at the International Film Festival Rotterdam, he decided it was the first day of the digital cinema and also the day he wants to make Night and Fog in Zona.

One day, Wang invites him to Yunnan where he shoots a documentary. Jung follows with his camera, from a nameless suburb city to the jungle near Laos' border, to record that winter and the story of the people of China.

Cast
 Wang Bing

Awards and nominations

Reception
Night and Fog in Zonia received positive ratings from critics. Il manifesto called the film "one of the best non-fiction movies seen this year".

References

External links 
 
 
 

2015 films
2010s Korean-language films
South Korean documentary films
Films directed by Jung Sung-il
2015 documentary films
2010s South Korean films